Jean-Pierre Makouta-Mboukou (17 July 1929 – 9 October 2012) was Congolese politician, academic, novelist and playwright.
For his abundant and eclectic work his biographers have called him the “Congolese Victor Hugo” and  the “baobab of Congolese literature”.

Life

Jean-Pierre Makouta-Mboukou was born on 17 July 1929 in Kindamba in the Pool department of the Republic of the Congo.
He held several doctorates, and taught French and African linguistics and literature in several universities, including the Sorbonne Nouvelle University Paris 3 for 22 years, but also in Ouagadougou, Abidjan, Dakar and Brazzaville.

He was strongly involved in politics, and was a deputy and minister plenipotentiary (1963–1968).
After the 1968 coup d'état, he was stripped of Congolese nationality and naturalized as French.
He was rehabilitated and regained Congolese nationality in 1991 and joined the Congolese Movement for Democracy and Integral Development (MCDDI).
He was a senator (1992–1997) and second vice-president of the Senate. 
He retired from political life after the civil war of 1997.
He died on 9 October 2012 at Pontoise hospital in Val-d'Oise, France.

Selected works 

Jean-Pierre Makouta-Mboukou was the author of about 25 books in a wide range of genres and about fifty articles published in various foreign journals.
 La Lèpre du roi : tragédie en deux actes, 1968 (concours théâtral interafricain 1968)
 Un Ministre nègre à Paris : comédie en trois actes, 1968 (concours théâtral interafricain 1968)
 Les Initiés, CLE, 1970
 Introduction à la littérature noire, CLE, 1970 (textes de cours et conférences donnés à Brazzaville entre 1963 et 1966)
 En quête de la liberté, ou, Une vie d'espoir : roman, CLE, 1970
 L'âme bleue : poèmes, CLE, 1971 
 Le français en Afrique noire : histoire et méthodes de l'enseignement du français en Afrique noire, Bordas, 1973 
 Réinterprétation morpho-phonique des emprunts français en langue téké de Manianga, Université Paris 3, 1973 (thèse de 3e cycle)	
 Cantate de l'ouvrier : poème, P.-J. Oswald, 1974
 Les exilés de la forêt vierge, ou, Le grand complot : roman, P.-J. Oswald, 1974
 Jacques Roumain : essai sur la signification spirituelle et religieuse de son œuvre, Université Paris 4, 1975 (thèse)
 Étude descriptive du fúmú, dialecte téké de Ngamaba, Brazzaville, Université Paris 3, 1977 (thèse d'État)
 Introduction à l'étude du roman négro-africain de langue française : problèmes culturels et littéraires, Nouvelles éditions africaines, Abidjan, 1980 	
 ... Et l'homme triompha !,  Fondation du Prix mondial de la Paix, Paris, 1983 
 Spiritualités et cultures dans la prose romanesque et la poésie négro-africaine (de l'oralité à l'écriture) , Nouvelles éditions africaines, Abidjan, 1983
 Les dents du destin, Nouvelles éditions africaines, Abidjan, Dakar, Lomé, 1984 
 Les grands traits de la poésie négro-africaine : histoire poétiques significations, Nouvelles éditions africaines, Abidjan, Dakar, Lomé, 1985
 Lettre à la nation africaine pour que s'impose l'humanisme nègre, Fondation du Prix mondial de la Paix, Paris, 1986
 L'homme aux pataugas : roman, L'Harmattan, 1992
 Les littératures de l'exil : des textes sacrés aux œuvres profanes : étude comparative, L'Harmattan, 1993
 Enfers et paradis des littératures antiques aux littératures nègres : illustration comparée de deux mondes surnaturels, H. Champion, 1996 
 La destruction de Brazzaville ou La démocratie guillotinée, L'Harmattan, 1996
 Systèmes, théories et méthodes comparés en critique littéraire, vol. I, Des poétiques antiques à la critique moderne ; vol. II, Des nouvelles critiques à l'éclectisme négro-africain, L'Harmattan, 2003
 Le contestant ou un pasteur chez les Carmélites, L'Harmattan, 2006

Distinctions 

Jean-Pierre Makouta-Mboukou was a member of the French Académie des sciences d'outre-mer and the International Council of the French Language (Conseil international de la langue française).

In 1985 he received the Grand prix littéraire d'Afrique noire for his Introduction to the Study of the French-language Negro-African Novel and the Main Features of Negro-African Poetry.
In 1994 he received the Aimé Césaire Literary Prize.

Notes

Sources

Further reading

 Geneviève Badang, Les Africains entre cultures ancestraux et christianisme : permanence du dilemme dans la littérature négro-africaine. Le cas de six auteurs francophones (Étienne Yanou, Cyriaque-Robert Yavoucko, René Philombé, Jean-Pierre Makouta-Mboukou, Charly-Gabriel Mbock, V.Y. Mudimbe), Université Paris 4, 1996 (thèse)

1929 births
2012 deaths
20th-century novelists
Republic of the Congo writers
Republic of the Congo politicians
Members of the National Assembly (Republic of the Congo)
Government ministers of the Republic of the Congo